Kwongsai may refer to:

The Guangxi people
Guangxi